Priscilla is a feminine given name.

Priscilla may also refer to:


Music
 Priscilla (album), a 2002 album by the French singer Priscilla
 "Priscilla", a song from the 2014 album Platinum by Miranda Lambert
 "Priscilla", a song on the album Midnight at the Lost and Found by Meat Loaf
 "Priscilla", a 1971 song by Phil Pickett
 "Priscilla" (Eddie Cooley song), 1957
 "Priscilla", a 1981 song by Yellowjackets, Jimmy Haslip, Robben Ford, Chris Palmaro
 "Priscilla", a song from her 2001 album Songs in Red and Gray by Suzanne Vega

Ships
 Priscilla (sloop), a U.S. National Historic Landmark berthed in West Sayville, New York
 USS Priscilla (SP-44), the proposed designation of a United States Navy auxiliary schooner acquired in 1917, but never commissioned

Other uses
 Hurricane Priscilla (disambiguation), the name of five tropical cyclones
 2137 Priscilla, an asteroid
 a small lunar crater near Davy (crater)
 Priscilla (nuclear test blast), part of the American Operation Plumbbob
 a tour bus in the movie The Adventures of Priscilla, Queen of the Desert and the musical Priscilla, Queen of the Desert

See also
 Catacomb of Priscilla, Rome, Italy
 Priscilla Apartments, Miami, Florida, on the National Register of Historic Places
 "Prescilla" (song), by Bat for Lashes